C72 may refer to :
 Ruy Lopez chess openings ECO code
 Malignant neoplasm of spinal cord, cranial nerves and other parts of central nervous system ICD-10 code
 Siemens C72, a mobile phone
 Honda C71, C76, C72, C77 Dream, motorcycle different models
 Paid Vacations (Seafarers) Convention, 1946 code
 Caldwell 72 (NGC 55), a barred irregular galaxy in the constellation Sculptor
 GER Class C72, a class of British steam locomotives